Part Fifteen (Part XV) of the Constitution of Albania is the fifteenth of eighteen parts. Titled Armed Forces, it consists of 4 articles sanctioning the function, duties and hierarchy of the Albanian Armed Forces.

Armed Forces

References

15